The Métis are Indigenous peoples whose historical homelands includes Canada's three Prairie Provinces, as well as parts of British Columbia, the Northwest Territories,  Northwest Ontario and the Northern United States. They have a shared history and culture, deriving from specific mixed European (primarily French) and Indigenous ancestry, which became distinct through ethnogenesis by the mid-18th century, during the early years of the North American fur trade.

In Canada, the Métis, with a population of 624,220 as of 2021, are one of three major groups of Indigenous peoples that were legally recognized in the Constitution Act of 1982, the other two groups being the First Nations and Inuit.

Smaller communities who self-identify as Métis exist in Canada and the United States, such as the Little Shell Tribe of Chippewa Indians of Montana. The United States recognizes the Little Shell Tribe as an Ojibwe Native American tribe.

Background

Etymology
The word métis itself is originally French for "person of mixed parentage" and derives from the Latin word mixtus, "of mixed" race.

Semantic definitions
Starting in the 17th century, the French word métis was initially used as a noun by those in the North American fur trade, and by settlers in general, to refer to people of mixed European and North American Indigenous parentage in New France (which at that time extended from southern Quebec through the Great Lakes to the Mississippi River, thence southward to Mississippi and Alabama). At the time, it applied generally to French-speaking people who were of partial Indigenous and partial ethnic French descent. It also came to be used for people of mixed European and Indigenous backgrounds in other French colonies, generally the children of unions between Frenchmen and women from the colonized areas, including Guadeloupe in the Caribbean; Senegal in West Africa; Algeria in North Africa; and the former French Indochina in Southeast Asia.

The first documented "métis" child was a girl born about 1628 near Lake Nipissing, given the first name Marguerite, who was the illegitimate daughter of a Nipissing Indian woman and Jean Nicollet de Belleborne (born about 1598, likely in Cherbourg, France).

As French Canadians followed the North American fur trade to the west, some of the settlers made unions with different Indigenous women, including the Cree. Descendants of English or Scottish and Natives were in some cases historically called "half-breeds" or "country born". They sometimes adopted a more agrarian culture of subsistence farming and tended to be reared in Protestant denominations. 

While the definitions and usage of the terms "Métis", "Metis" and "metis" (lowercase) have at times been controversial and contentious, there are legal definitions. 

Capital 'M' Métis refers to a particular sociocultural heritage and an ethnic identification. It is more than a racial classification and refers specifically to the Métis Indigenous peoples in Canada and the United States. Numerous spellings of Métis have been used interchangeably, including métif, michif; currently the most agreed-upon spelling is Métis; however, some prefer to use Metis as inclusive of persons of both English and French descent.

The spelling métis with a lowercase m functions as an adjective. The definition of the word has at times been disputed, as some people have attempted to use lower-case métis in the archaic sense of having a single, distant Indigenous ancestor or being in some other way "mixed". However, the majority of Indigenous groups and legal scholars define Métis as the people who live on the Métis homeland. "Most curators and scholars argue that the development of the Métis nation occurred at the Red River Settlement and that Métis families dispersed from there to other regions."

Canadian Geographic's Indigenous Peoples Altas of Canada identifies Métis people as one of three Canadian Indigenous peoples in the following terms:Within non-Indigenous society, there are two competing ideas of what being Métis means. The first, when spelled with a lowercase "m" (métis), means individuals or people having mixed-race parents and ancestries, e.g., North American Indigenous and European/Euro-Canadian/Euro-American. It is a racial categorization. This is the oldest meaning of métis and is based on the French verb métisser [sic], to mix races or ethnicities. The related noun for the act of race-mixing is métissage. The second meaning of being Métis, and the one that is embraced by the Métis Nation, relates to a self-defining people with a distinct history in a specific region (Western Canada's prairies) with some spillover into British Columbia, Ontario, North Dakota, Montana and Northwest Territories. In this case, the term Métis is spelled with an uppercase "M" and often, but does not always, contain an accent aigu (é).

The Métis of Canada and the Métis of the United States adopted parts of their Indigenous and European cultures while forming customs and traditions of their own, as well as developing a common language. Some argue that the ethnogenesis of the Métis began when the Métis organized politically at the Battle of Seven Oaks in 1816, while others argue that the ethnogenesis began prior to this battle, before fur traders emigrated from the Great Lakes region to the Western plains.

Other groups and individuals
Scholars, Métis people, and First Nations elders and community leaders concur that only the descendants of the Red River Métis should be constitutionally recognized as Métis people, as they developed a distinct culture as a people historically, and have continued to exist as a distinct culture and community over many generations.

Objections to this standard have been made to the Métis National Council, by both individuals and newly-formed groups who do not meet the established citizenship criteria. These individuals and unrecognized groups have recently emerged largely in the Maritime, Quebec, and Ontario regions, and are generally referred to as "Eastern Metis". These complainants usually assert that having a single, distant, Indigenous or possibly-Indigenous ancestor should be enough to be considered Métis. They also disagree that they should have to meet the resident requirement as defined by the federally recognized Métis organizations.

David Chartrand, president of the Métis National Council, responding in 2020 said he does not believe these new, self-identified individuals and communities are Métis,

In a 2016 decision, Daniels v Canada (Indian Affairs and Northern Development), the Supreme Court of Canada stated in par. 17:

Indigenous elders from the Miꞌkmaq and other First Nations communities in the Eastern part of Canada, along with recognized Métis leaders, do not agree with the settler-colonial perspective, and say that there is no distinct Metis community or culture in the Maritimes or Quebec, and that these newly-formed, "Eastern Metis" groups are not legitimate:
People of mixed blood in the region either integrated into Indigenous communities or assimilated with European newcomers, unlike the distinct Metis People of Louis Riel in Western Canada.
"When you're looking at the Maritimes and Quebec, the children of intermarriage were accepted by either party, in our case the Mi'kmaq or the Acadian," Mi'kmaw elder and historian Daniel Paul says. "There was no such thing as a Metis community here in this region."

Riel's Métis
Quoting Riel from Tremaudan's Histoire de la nation métisse dans l'ouest canadien:

Métis people in Canada

Métis people in Canada are specific cultural communities who trace their descent to First Nations and European settlers, primarily the French, in the early decades of the colonisation of Canada. Métis peoples are recognized as one of Canada's Indigenous peoples under the Constitution Act of 1982, along with First Nations and Inuit. On April 8, 2014, the Supreme Court of Canada Daniels v Canada appeal held that "Métis and non status Indians are 'Indians' under s. 91(24)", but excluded the Powley test as the only criterion to determine Metis identity. Canadian Métis represent the majority of people who identify as Métis, although there are a number of Métis in the United States. In Canada, the population is 587,545 with 20.5 percent living in Ontario and 19.5 percent in Alberta. The Acadians of eastern Canada, some of whom have mixed French and Indigenous origins, are not Métis according to Indian and Northern Affairs Canada and other historic Indigenous communities. This viewpoint sees Métis as historically the children of French fur traders and Nehiyaw women of western and west central Canada.

While the Métis initially developed as the mixed-race descendants of early unions between First Nations and colonial-era European settlers (usually Indigenous women and male French settlers), within generations (particularly in central and western Canada), a distinct Métis culture developed. The women in the unions in eastern Canada were usually Algonquin and Ojibwe, and in western Canada they were Saulteaux, Cree, Ojibwe, Nakoda and Dakota/Lakota or of mixed descent from these peoples. Their unions with European men engaged in the fur trade in the Old Northwest were often of the type known as marriage à la façon du pays ("according to the custom of the country").

After New France was ceded to Great Britain's control in 1763, there was an important distinction between French Métis born of francophone voyageur fathers and the Anglo-Métis (known as "country born" or Mixed Bloods, for instance in the 1870 census of Manitoba) descended from English or Scottish fathers. Today these two cultures have essentially coalesced into location-specific Métis traditions. This does not preclude a range of other Métis cultural expressions across North America. Such polyethnic people were historically referred to by other terms, many of which are now considered to be offensive, such as Mixed-bloods, Half-breeds, Bois-Brûlés, Bungi, Black Scots and Jackatars, the latter term having meaning in a Newfoundland context.

While people of Métis culture or heritage are found across Canada, the traditional Métis "homeland" (areas where Métis populations and culture developed as a distinct ethnicity historically) includes much of the present-day Canadian Prairies along with parts of Northwestern Ontario, British Columbia, and the Northwest-Nunavut Territory. The most well-known group are the "Red River Métis", centering on southern and central parts of Manitoba along the Red River of the North.

Closely related are the Métis in the United States, primarily those in border areas such as Northern Michigan, the Red River Valley and Eastern Montana. These were areas in which there was considerable Aboriginal and European mixing due to the 19th-century fur trade. However, they do not have a federally recognized status in the United States, except as enrolled members of federally recognized tribes. Although Métis existed farther west than today's Manitoba, much less is known about the Métis of Northern Canada.

Identity

Self-identity and legal status
In 2016, 587,545 people in Canada self-identified as Métis. They represented 35.1% of the total Aboriginal population and 1.5% of the total Canadian population. Most Métis people today are descendants of unions between generations of Métis individuals and live in urban areas. The exception are the Métis in rural and northern parts that exist in close proximity to First Nations communities.

Over the past century, countless Métis have assimilated into the general European Canadian populations. Métis heritage (and thereby Aboriginal ancestry) is more common than is generally realized. People with more distant ancestry, who assimilated into non-Métis society, are not part of the Métis ethnicity or culture.

Unlike among First Nations peoples, laws concerning the Métis make no distinction between Treaty status and non-Treaty status. The Métis did not sign treaties with Canada, with the exception of an adhesion to Treaty 3 in Northwest Ontario. This adherence was never implemented by the federal government. The legal definition is not yet fully developed. Section Thirty-five of the Constitution Act, 1982 recognizes the rights of Indian, Métis and Inuit; however, that text does not define these groups. In 2003, the Supreme Court of Canada defined a Métis person as someone who self-identifies as Métis, has an ancestral connection to the historic Métis community, and is accepted by the modern community with continuity to the historic Métis community.

View of identity
The most well-known and historically documented mixed-ancestry population in Canadian history are the groups who developed during the fur trade in south-eastern Rupert's Land, primarily in the Red River Settlement (now Manitoba) and the Southbranch Settlements (Saskatchewan). In the late nineteenth century, they organized politically (led by men who had European educations) and had confrontations with the Canadian government in an effort to assert their independence.

This was not the only place where some degree of intermixing (métisser) between European and Indigenous people occurred. It was part of the history of colonization from the earliest days of settlements on the Atlantic Coast throughout the Americas. But the strong sense of ethnic national identity among the mostly French- and Michif-speaking Métis along the Red River, demonstrated during armed resistance movements led by Louis Riel, resulted in a specific use of the term "Métis" throughout Canada.

Continued organizing and political activity resulted in "the Métis" gaining official recognition from the national government as one of the recognized Aboriginal groups in S.35 of the Constitution Act, 1982, which states:

Section 35(2) does not define criteria for an individual who is Métis. This has left open the question of whether "Métis" in this context should apply only to the descendants of the Red River Métis or to all mixed-ancestry groups and individuals. Many members of First Nations may have mixed ancestry but identify primarily by the tribal nation, rather than as Métis.

Lack of a legal definition

In contrast to the Indian Act, which creates an Indian Register for all (Status) First Nations people, settler-colonial definitions of Métis, Metis and metis have at times been at odds with the definitions of the communities themselves. Some commentators have argued that one of the rights of an Indigenous people is to define their own identity, precluding the need for a government-sanctioned definition. 

Alberta is the only province to have defined the term in law under the Métis Settlements Act (MSA), which defines a Métis as "a person of Aboriginal ancestry who identifies with Métis history and culture". This was done in the context of creating a test for legal eligibility for membership in one of Alberta's eight Métis settlements. The MSA, together with requirements at the community level (Elder & community acceptance) create the legal requirements for residency on the Métis Settlements. In Alberta law, belonging to a "Métis Association" (Métis National Council or any of its affiliates, Métis Federation of Canada, Congress of Aboriginal People) does not grant one the rights granted to members of the Alberta Métis Settlements. The MSA test excludes those people who are Status Indians (that is, a member of a First Nation), an exclusion which was upheld by the Supreme Court in Alberta v. Cunningham (2011).

The number of people self-identifying as Métis has risen sharply since the late 20th century: between 1996 and 2006, the population of Canadians who self-identify as Métis nearly doubled, to approximately 390,000. From 2006 to 2016, according to census results from Statistics Canada, those numbers rose by 125% in Nova Scotia, and 150% in Quebec. Also in that time, "Dozens" of new "Metis" organizations appeared, none of whom could demonstrate any ties to continually-existing Métis communities.

Until R v. Powley (2003), there was no legal definition of Métis other than the legal requirements found in the Métis Settlements Act of 1990. The Powley case involved a claim by Steven Powley and his son Rodney, two members of the Sault Ste. Marie, Ontario Métis community who were asserting Métis hunting rights. The Supreme Court of Canada outlined three broad factors to identify Métis who have Hunting Rights as Aboriginal peoples:

All three factors must be present for an individual to qualify under the SCC legal definition of Métis. In addition, the court stated that

Questions remain as to whether Métis have treaty rights; this is an explosive issue in the Canadian Aboriginal community today. It has been stated that "only First Nations could legitimately sign treaties with the government so, by definition, Métis have no Treaty rights." One treaty names Métis in the title: the Halfbreed (Métis in the French version) Adhesion to Treaty 3. Another, the Robinson Superior Treaty of 1850, listed 84 persons classified as "half-breeds" in the Treaty, so included them and their descendants. Hundreds, if not thousands, of Métis were initially included in a number of other treaties, and then excluded under later amendments to the Indian Act.

Definitions used by Métis representative organizations
Two main advocacy groups claim to speak for the Métis in Canada: the Congress of Aboriginal Peoples (CAP) and the Métis National Council (MNC). Each uses different approaches to define Métis individuals. The CAP, which has nine regional affiliates, represents all Indigenous peoples in Canada who are living off-reserve, including Métis and non-Status Indians. It does not provide a definition of "Métis", but instead leaves each affiliate determine its own membership criteria.

Due to the exclusion of a Métis representative among the Native Council of Canada's two seats at the Constitutional Conference in 1983, the Manitoba Métis Federation (MMF), the Association of Métis and Non-Status Indians of Saskatchewan (AMNSIS) and the Métis Association of Alberta (MAA) withdrew from the NCC (CAP's predecessor) and formed the Métis National Council. Its political leadership of the time stated that the NCC's "pan-Aboriginal approach to issues did not allow the Métis Nation to effectively represent itself". The MNC views the Métis as a single nation with a common history and culture centred on the fur trade of "west-central North America" in the eighteenth and nineteenth centuries. This position has been subject to much debate and controversy.

In 2003, MNC had five provincial affiliates:
Métis Nation of Ontario Secretariat, 
Manitoba Métis Federation Inc.,
Métis Nation - Saskatchewan,
Métis Nation of Alberta, and the
Métis Nation of British Columbia.

The Metis Nation of Alberta (MNA), formerly known as the Métis Association of Alberta (MAA), adopted the following "Definition of Métis":

Several local, independent Métis organizations have been founded in Canada. In Northern Canada neither the CAP nor the MNC have affiliates; here local Métis organizations deal directly with the federal government and are part of the Aboriginal land claims process. Three of the comprehensive settlements (modern treaties) in force in the Northwest Territories include benefits for Métis people who can prove local Aboriginal ancestry prior to 1921 (Treaty 11).

The federal government recognizes the Métis National Council as the representative Métis group. In December 2016, Prime Minister Trudeau made a commitment to the leaders of the Assembly of First Nations, the Inuit Tapiriit Kanatami, and the Métis National Council to have annual meetings. He also committed to two other initiatives aimed at heeding the Calls to Action of the Truth and Reconciliation Commission (TRC) which examined abuses at Indian Residential Schools.

Indigenous Affairs Canada, the relevant federal ministry, deals with the MNC. On April 13, 2017, the two parties signed the Canada-Métis Nation Accord, with the goal of working with the Métis Nation, as represented by the Métis National Council, on a Nation to Nation basis.

In response to the Powley decision, Métis organizations are issuing Métis Nation citizenship cards to their members. Several organizations are registered with the Canadian government to provide Métis cards. The criteria to receive a card and the rights associated with the card vary with each organization. For example, for membership in the Métis Nation of Alberta (MNA), an applicant must provide a documented genealogy and family tree dating to the mid-1800s, proving descent from one or more members of historic Métis groups.

Cultural definitions
Cultural definitions of Métis identity inform legal and political ones.

The 1996 Report of the Royal Commission on Aboriginal Peoples stated:

Traditional markers of Métis culture include use of Aboriginal-European languages, such as Michif (French-Cree-Dene) and Bungi (Cree-Ojibwa-English); distinctive clothing, such as the arrowed sash (ceinture flêchée); a rich repertoire of fiddle music, jigs and square dances, and practising a traditional economy based on hunting, trapping, and gathering. However, these cultural markers do not exclude Métis that do not partake in them.

Canadian history

During the height of the North American fur trade in New France from 1650 onward, many French and British fur traders married First Nations and Inuit women, mainly Cree, Ojibwa or Saulteaux located in the Great Lakes area and later into the north west. The majority of these fur traders were French and Scottish; the French majority were Catholic. These marriages are commonly referred to as marriage à la façon du pays or marriage according to the "custom of the country." 

At first, the Hudson's Bay Company officially forbade these relationships. However, many Indigenous peoples actively encouraged them, because they drew fur traders into Indigenous kinship circles, creating social ties that supported the economic relationships developing between them and Europeans. When Indigenous women married European men, they introduced them to their people and their culture, taught them about the land and its resources, and worked alongside them. Indigenous women paddled and steered canoes, made moccasins out of moose skin, netted webbing for snowshoes, skinned animals and dried their meat for pemmican, split and dried fish, snared rabbits and partridges, and helped to manufacture birchbark canoes. Intermarriage made the fur trade more successful.

The children of these marriages were often introduced to Catholicism, but grew up in primarily First Nations societies. They were thought of as the familial bond between the Europeans and First Nations and Inuit of North America. As adults, the men often worked as fur-trade company interpreters, as well as fur trappers in their turn. Many of the first generations of Métis lived within the First Nations societies of their wives and children, but also started to marry Métis women.

By the early 19th century, marriage between European fur traders and First Nations or Inuit women started to decline as European fur traders began to marry Métis women instead, because Métis women were familiar with both white and Indigenous cultures, and could interpret.

According to historian Jacob A. Schooley, the Métis developed over at least two generations and within different economic classes. In the first stage, "servant" (employee) traders of the fur trade companies, known as wintering partners, would stay for the season with First Nations bands, and make a "country marriage" with a high-status native woman. This woman and her children would move to live in the vicinity of a trading fort or post, becoming "House Indians" (as they were called by the company men). House Indians eventually formed distinct bands. Children raised within these "House Indian" bands often became employees of the companies. (Foster cites the York boat captain Paulet Paul as an example). Eventually this second-generation group ended employment with the company and became commonly known as "freemen" traders and trappers. They lived with their families raising children in a distinct culture, accustomed to the fur-trade life, that valued free trading and the buffalo hunt in particular. He considered that the third generation, who were sometimes Métis on both sides, were the first true Métis. He suggests that in the Red River region, many "House Indians" (and some non-"House" First Nations) were assimilated into Métis culture due to the Catholic church's strong presence in that region. In the Fort Edmonton region, however, many House Indians never adopted a Métis identity but continued to identify primarily as Cree, Saulteaux, Ojibwa, and Chipweyan descendants up until the early 20th century.
The Métis played a vital role in the success of the western fur trade. They were skilled hunters and trappers, and were raised to appreciate both Aboriginal and European cultures. Métis understanding of both societies and customs helped bridge cultural gaps, resulting in better trading relationships. The Hudson's Bay Company discouraged unions between their fur traders and First Nations and Inuit women, while the North West Company (the English-speaking Quebec-based fur trading company) supported such marriages. Trappers often married First Nations women too, and operated outside company structures. The Métis peoples were respected as valuable employees of both fur trade companies, due to their skills as voyageurs, buffalo hunters and interpreters, and for their knowledge of the lands.

By the early 1800s European immigrants, mainly Scottish farmers, along with Métis families from the Great Lakes region moved to the Red River Valley in present-day Manitoba. The Hudson's Bay Company, which now administered a monopoly over the territory then called Rupert's Land, assigned plots of land to European settlers. The allocation of Red River land caused conflict with those already living in the area, as well as with the North West Company, whose trade routes had been cut in half. Many Métis were working as fur traders with both the North West Company and the Hudson's Bay Company. Others were working as free traders, or buffalo hunters supplying pemmican to the fur trade. The buffalo were declining in number, and the Métis and First Nations had to go farther and further west to hunt them. Profits from the fur trade were declining because of a reduction in European demand due to changing tastes, as well as the need for the Hudson's Bay Company to extend its reach farther from its main posts to get furs.

Most references to the Métis in the 19th century applied to the Plains Métis, but more particularly the Red River Métis. But, the Plains Métis tended to identify by occupational categories: buffalo hunters, pemmican and fur traders, and "tripmen" in the York boat fur brigades among the men; the moccasin sewers and cooks among the women. The largest community in the Assiniboine-Red River district had a different lifestyle and culture from those Métis located in the Saskatchewan, Alberta, Athabasca, and Peace river valleys to the west.

In 1869, two years after Canadian Confederacy, the Government of Canada exerted its power over the people living in Rupert's Land after it acquired the land in the mid-19th century from the Hudson's Bay Company. The Métis and the Anglo-Métis (commonly known as Countryborn, children of First Nations women and Orcadian, other Scottish or English men), joined forces to stand up for their rights. They wanted to protect their traditional ways of life against an aggressive and distant Anglo-Canadian government and its local colonizing agents. An 1870 census of Manitoba classified the population as follows: 11,963 total people. Of this number 558 were defined as Indians (First Nations). There were 5,757 Métis and 4,083 English-speaking Mixed Bloods. The remaining 1,565 people were of predominately European, Canadian or American background.

During this time the Canadian government signed treaties (known as the "Numbered Treaties") with various First Nations. These Nations ceded property rights to almost the entire western plains to the Government of Canada. In return for their ceding traditional lands, the Canadian government promised food, education, medical help, etc. While the Métis generally did not sign any treaty as a group, they were sometimes included, even listed as "half-breeds" in some records.

In the late 19th century, following the British North America Act (1867), Louis Riel, a Métis who was formally educated, became a leader of the Métis in the Red River area. He denounced the Canadian government surveys on Métis lands in a speech delivered in late August 1869 in front of Saint Boniface Cathedral. The Métis became more fearful when the Canadian government appointed the notoriously anti-French William McDougall as the Lieutenant Governor of the Northwest Territories on September 28, 1869, in anticipation of a formal transfer of lands to take effect in December.} On November 2, 1869, Louis Riel and 120 men seized Upper Fort Garry, the administrative headquarters of the Hudson's Bay Company. This was the first overt act of Métis resistance. On March 4, 1870, the Provisional Government, led by Louis Riel, executed Thomas Scott after Scott was convicted of insubordination and treason. The elected Legislative Assembly of Assiniboia subsequently sent three delegates to Ottawa to negotiate with the Canadian government. This resulted in the Manitoba Act and that province's entry into the Canadian Confederation. Due to the execution of Scott, Riel was charged with murder and fled to the United States in exile.

In March 1885, the Métis heard that a contingent of 500 North-West Mounted Police was heading west. They organized and formed the Provisional Government of Saskatchewan, with Pierre Parenteau as president and Gabriel Dumont as adjutant-general. Riel took charge of a few hundred armed men. They suffered defeat by Canadian armed forces in a conflict known as the North-West Resistance, which occurred in northern Saskatchewan from March 26 to May 12, 1885. Gabriel Dumont fled to the United States, while Riel, Poundmaker, and Big Bear surrendered. Big Bear and Poundmaker each were convicted and received a three-year sentence. On July 6, 1885, Riel was convicted of high treason and was sentenced to hang. Riel appealed but he was executed on November 16, 1885.

Culture

Language

A majority of the Métis once spoke, and many still speak, either Métis French or an Indigenous language such as Cree, Anishinaabemowin, Denésoliné, etc. A few in some regions spoke a mixed language called Michif which is composed of Plains Cree verbs and French nouns. Michif, Mechif or Métchif is a phonetic spelling of the Métis pronunciation of Métif, a variant of Métis. The Métis today predominantly speak Canadian English, with Canadian French a strong second language, as well as numerous Aboriginal tongues.

Michif is most used in the United States, notably in the Turtle Mountain Indian Reservation of North Dakota. There Michif is the official language of the Métis who reside on this Chippewa (Ojibwe) reservation. After years of decline in use of these languages, the provincial Métis councils are encouraging their revival, use in communities and teaching in schools. The encouragement and use of Métis French and Michif is growing due to outreach after at least a generation of decline.

The 19th-century community of Anglo-Métis, more commonly known as Countryborn, were children of people in the Rupert's Land fur trade; they were typically of Orcadian, other Scottish, or English paternal descent and Aboriginal maternal descent. Their first languages would have been Aboriginal (Cree language, Saulteaux language, Assiniboine language, etc.) and English. The Gaelic and Scots spoken by Orcadians and other Scots became part of the creole language referred to as "Bungee".

Flag
The  Métis flag is one of the oldest patriotic flags originating in Canada. The Métis have two flags. Both flags use the same design of a central infinity symbol, but are different colours. The first red flag was given to Cuthbert Grant in 1815 by the North-West Company as reported by James Sutherland. Days before the Battle of Seven Oaks, "La Grenouillère" in 1816, Peter Fidler recorded Cuthbert Grant flying the blue flag. The red and blue are not cultural or linguistic identifiers and do not represent the companies.

Cultural genocide
In 2019, the final report, Reclaiming Power and Place, by the National Inquiry into Missing and Murdered Indigenous Women and Girls stated "The violence the National Inquiry heard amounts to a race-based genocide of Indigenous Peoples, including First Nations, Inuit and Métis, which especially targets women and girls."

Land ownership
Issues of land ownership became a central theme, as the Métis sold most of the 600,000 acres (2430 km2) they received in the first settlement.

During the 1930s, political activism arose in Métis communities in Alberta and Saskatchewan over land rights, and some filed land claims for the return of certain lands.
Five men, sometimes dubbed "The Famous Five", (James P. Brady, Malcolm Norris, Peter Tomkins Jr., Joe Dion, Felix Callihoo) were instrumental in having the Alberta government form the 1934 "Ewing Commission", headed by Albert Ewing, to deal with land claims The Alberta government passed the Métis Population Betterment Act in 1938.The Act provided funding and land to the Métis. (The provincial government later rescinded portions of the land in certain areas.)

Organizations
The Provisional Government of Saskatchewan was the name given by Louis Riel to the independent state he declared during the North-West Rebellion (Resistance) of 1885 in what is today the Canadian province of Saskatchewan. The governing council was named the Exovedate, Latin for "of the flock". The council debated issues ranging from military policy to local bylaws and theological issues. It met at Batoche, Saskatchewan, and exercised real authority only over the Southbranch Settlement. The provisional government collapsed that year after the Battle of Batoche.

The Métis National Council was formed in 1983, following the recognition of the Métis as "aboriginal peoples of Canada", in Section Thirty-five of the Constitution Act, 1982. The MNC was a member of the World Council of Indigenous Peoples (WCIP). In 1997 the Métis National Council was granted NGO Consultative Status with the United Nations Economic and Social Council. The MNC's first ambassador to this group was Clement Chartier. MNC is a founding member of the American Council of Indigenous Peoples (ACIP).

The Métis National Council is currently composed of four provincial Métis organizations, though numbers have varied over time. namely,

 Métis Nation of Alberta
 Métis Nation British Columbia
 Métis Nation-Saskatchewan
 Métis Nation of Ontario

There used to be five groups, but in September 2021 the Manitoba Metis Federation left over membership issues involving the Métis Nation of Ontario (MNO), with President David Chartrand citing issues of the Council accepting the MNO despite the MNO having "nearly 80 per cent non-Métis Nation Citizens in their registry." The Métis National Council has stated that they reject the idea of new Ontario Métis communities, and in 2020 they suspended the membership of the Métis Nation of Ontario, due to concerns that 90% of the MNOs registered members did not fulfill the requirements of citizenship put in place by the National Council in 2002, notably the requirement for an ancestral link to the Métis homelands and the Red River area specifically.. On March 22nd 2022, in response to David Chartrand's comments on MNO suspension, President Margaret Froh stated her position that "The MNO was never suspended, the MNO was on probation and there was a decision by just a few individuals declaring that the MNO was suspended when in fact that wasn't correct and in fact we (MNO) went to court and the court concluded we were not suspended. The Ontario group had granted memberships to people from four disputed communities: Mattawa, Georgian Bay, Killarney, and Temiskaming, claiming these groups consist of Métis people, and not simply regions inhabited by First Nations individuals and some settlers, but without cultural ties to the recognized Métis communities. When the suspension was announced, a motion was passed to create a panel of experts, including representatives from the four Métis Nation governments (including MNO), to "gather information and present findings and recommendations" on how to proceed.

The National Council holds province-wide ballot box elections for political positions in these associations, held at regular intervals, for regional and provincial leadership. Métis citizens and their communities are represented and participate in these Métis governance structures by way of elected Locals or Community Councils, as well as provincial assemblies held annually.

The Congress of Aboriginal Peoples (CAP) and its nine regional affiliates represent all Aboriginal people who are not part of the reserve system, including Métis and non-Status Indians.

Métis settlements of Alberta

The Métis settlements in Alberta are the only recognized land base of Métis in Canada. They are represented and governed collectively by a unique Métis government known as the Métis Settlements General Council (MSGC), also known as the "All-Council". The MSGC is the provincial, national, and international representative of the Federated Métis Settlements. It holds fee simple land title via Letters Patents to 1.25 million acres (5060 km2) of land, making the MSGC the largest land holder in the province, other than the Crown in the Right of Alberta. The MSGC is the only recognized Métis Government in Canada with prescribed land, power, and jurisdiction via the Métis Settlements Act. (This legislation followed legal suits filed by the Métis Settlements against the Crown in the 1970s).

The Métis settlements consist of predominantly Indigenous Métis populations native to Northern Alberta – distinct from those of the Red River, the Great Lakes, and other migrant Métis from further east. However, following the Riel and Dumont resistances some Red-River Métis fled westward, where they married into the contemporary Métis settlement populations during the end of the 19th century and into the early 20th century. Historically referred to as the "Nomadic Half-breeds", the Métis of Northern Alberta have a unique history. Their fight for land is still evident today with the eight contemporary Métis settlements.

Following the formal establishment of the Métis settlements, then called Half-Breed Colonies, in the 1930s by a distinct Métis political organization, the Métis populations in Northern Alberta were the only Métis to secure communal Métis lands. During renewed Indigenous activism during the 1960s into the 1970s, political organizations were formed or revived among the Métis. In Alberta, the Métis settlements united as: The "Alberta Federation of Métis Settlement Associations" in the mid-1970s. Today, the Federation is represented by the Métis Settlements General Council.

During the constitutional talks of 1982, the Métis were recognized as one of the three Aboriginal peoples of Canada, in part by the Federation of Métis Settlements. In 1990, the Alberta government, following years of conferences and negotiations between the Federation of Métis Settlements (FMS) and the Crown in the Right of Alberta, restored land titles to the northern Métis communities through the Métis Settlement Act, replacing the Métis Betterment Act.Originally the first Métis settlements in Alberta were called colonies and consisted of:

 Buffalo Lake (Caslan) or Beaver River
 Cold Lake
 East Prairie (south of Lesser Slave Lake)
 Elizabeth (east of Elk Point)
 Fishing Lake (Packechawanis)
 Gift Lake (Ma-cha-cho-wi-se) or Utikuma Lake
 Goodfish Lake
 Kikino
 Kings Land
 Marlboro
 Paddle Prairie (or Keg River)
 Peavine (Big Prairie, north of High Prairie)
 Touchwood
 Wolf Lake (north of Bonnyville)

In the 1960s, the settlements of Marlboro, Touchwood, Cold Lake, and Wolf Lake were dissolved by Order-in-Council by the Alberta Government. The remaining Métis Settlers were forced to move into one of the eight remaining Métis Settlements – leaving the eight contemporary Métis Settlements.

The position of Federal Interlocutor for Métis and Non-Status Indians was created in 1985 as a portfolio in the Canadian Cabinet. The Department of Indian Affairs and Northern Development is officially responsible only for Status Indians and largely with those living on Indian reserves. The new position was created in order provide a liaison between the federal government and Métis and non-status Aboriginal peoples, urban Aboriginals, and their representatives.

Ontario Métis Aboriginal Association
The Woodland Métis are not affiliated with the Métis Nation of Ontario (MNO) and MNO President Tony Belcourt said in 2005 that he did not know who OMAA members are, but that they are not Métis. In a Supreme Court of Canada appeal (Document C28533, page 17), the federal government states that "membership in OMAA and/or MNO does not establish membership in the specific local aboriginal community for the purposes of establishing a s. 35 [Indigenous and treaty] right. Neither OMAA nor the MNO constitute the sort of discrete, historic and site-specific community contemplated by Van der Peet capable of holding a constitutionally protected aboriginal right". (See: Other groups and individuals)

Distribution
According to the 2016 Canada Census, a total of 587,545 individuals self-identified as Métis. However, it is doubtful that all such individuals would meet the objective tests laid out in the Supreme Court decisions Powley and Daniels and therefore qualify as "Métis" for the purposes of Canadian law. Data from this section is from the 2016 Canadian Census by Statistics Canada.

Métis people in the United States

Métis people in the United States are a specific culture and community, who descend from unions between Native American and early European colonist parents – usually Indigenous women who married French, and later Scottish or English, men, who worked as fur trappers and traders during the 17th to 19th centuries in the fur trade era. The women were usually Algonquian, Ojibwe and Cree. They developed as an ethnic and cultural group from the descendants of these unions.

In the French colonies, people of mixed Indigenous and French ancestry were referred to by those who spoke French as métis, meaning "mixture." Being bilingual, these people were able to trade European goods, such as muskets, for the furs and hides at a trading post. These Métis were found throughout the Great Lakes area and to the west, in the Rocky Mountains. While the word in this usage originally had no ethnic designation (and was not capitalized in English), it grew to describe a specific ethnicity by the early 19th century. This use (of simply meaning "mixed") excludes mixed-race people born of unions in other settings or more recently than about 1870.

Fewer Métis live in the U.S. than in Canada. During the early colonial era, people moved easily back and forth through Canada and the British colonies. While the two communities come from the same origins, the Canadian Métis have developed further as an ethnic group than those in the U.S.

As of 2018, Métis people lived in Michigan, Illinois, Ohio, Minnesota, North Dakota and Montana.

Geography
With exploration, settlement, and exploitation of resources by French and British fur trading interests across North America, European men often had relationships and sometimes marriages with Native American women. Often both sides felt such marriages were beneficial in strengthening the fur trade. Indigenous women often served as interpreters and could introduce their men to their people. Because many Native Americans and First Nations often had matrilineal kinship systems, the mixed-race children were considered born to the mother's clan and usually raised in her culture. Fewer were educated in European schools. The métis children that did attempt to go about integrating into European societies faced many issues with attempting to obtain citizenship within these early settlements. The métis men in the northern tier typically worked in the fur trade and later hunting and as guides. The métis based in Red River Colony eventually settled throughout the Canadian Prairies as a distinct ethnic group with its own culture known as the Métis.

American history
Between 1795 and 1815, a network of Métis settlements and trading posts was established throughout what is now the US states of Michigan and Wisconsin and to a lesser extent in Illinois and Indiana. As late as 1829, the Métis were dominant in the economy of present-day Wisconsin and Northern Michigan.

During the early days of territorial Michigan, Métis and French played a dominant role in elections. It was largely with Métis support that Gabriel Richard was elected as delegate to Congress. After Michigan was admitted as a state and under pressure of increased European-American settlers from eastern states, many Métis migrated westward into the Canadian Prairies, including the Red River Colony and the Southbranch Settlement. Others identified with Chippewa groups, while many others were subsumed in an ethnic "French" identity, such as the Muskrat French. By the late 1830s only in the area of Sault Ste. Marie was there recognition of the Métis as a significant part of the community.

Another major Métis settlement was La Baye, located at the present site of Green Bay, Wisconsin. In 1816 most of its residents were Métis.

In Montana a large group of Métis from Pembina region hunted there in the 1860s, eventually forming an agricultural settlement in the Judith Basin by 1880. This settlement eventually disintegrated, with most Métis leaving or identifying more strongly either as "white" or "Indian".

Metis often participated in interracial marriages. The French in specific, viewed these marriages as sensible and realistic. Americans, however, viewed interracial marriages as unsound as the idea of racial purity was seen as the only option. Although it was legal, the result of these marriages generally resulted in the loss of status for the spouse of the highest social class, as well as for any children produced during the marriage. The French, however, seemed to motivate fur traders to participate in interracial marriages with Indian tribes as they helped to be beneficial to the fur trade business and also to spread religion. Generally speaking, these marriages were happy ones, that lasted and brought together differing groups of people and benefitted the fur trade business.

Current population
Mixed-race people live throughout Canada and the northern United States but only some in the US identify ethnically and culturally as Métis. A strong Prairie Métis identity exists in the Métis Homeland which existed in most of Rupert's Land, but also extends south from Canada into Minnesota, Montana and North Dakota,.A number of self-identified Métis live in North Dakota, mostly in Pembina County. Many members of the Turtle Mountain Band of Chippewa Indians (a federally recognized Tribe) identify as Métis or Michif rather than as strictly Ojibwe.

Many Métis families are recorded in the U.S. Census for the historic Métis settlement areas along the Detroit and St. Clair rivers, Mackinac Island and Sault Ste. Marie, Michigan, as well as Green Bay in Wisconsin. Their ancestral families were often formed in the early 19th-century fur trading era.

Métis persons have generally not organized as an ethnic or political group in the United States as they have in Canada, where they had armed confrontations.

The first "Conference on the Métis in North America" was held in Chicago in 1981, after increasing research about this people. This also was a period of increased appreciation for different ethnic groups and reappraisal of the histories of settlement of North America. Papers at the conference focused on "becoming Métis" and the role of history in formation of this ethnic group, defined in Canada as having Aboriginal status. The Metis peoples and their history continue to be extensively studied, especially by scholars in Canada and the United States.

Louis Riel and the United States
Riel had a significant impact on the Métis community in Canada, especially in the Manitoba region. However, he did also have a distinct relationship with the Métis in the United States and was in fact at the time of his execution an American citizen. Riel attempted to be a leader for the Métis community in the United States and contributed immensely in the defence of the Métis rights, especially those who occupied the Red River region throughout his life.

On October 22, 1844, Louis Riel was born in the Red River settlement known as the territory of Assiniboia. He was born with British background; however, as the Métis are a mobile community, he travelled a lot and had a transitional identity, meaning he would often cross the Canada and United States border. During the 19th century, there were few American-born citizens living in Red River altogether.

Riel greatly contributed to the defense of Métis justice, more specifically on November 22, 1869, Riel arrived in Winnipeg to discuss with McDougall the rights of the Métis community. At the end of the settlement McDougall agreed to guarantee a “List of Rights”. That statement also incorporated four clauses of the Dakota bill of rights. This Bill of rights was the rise of the American Métis influence during the Red River Métis revolution and was an important milestone in Métis justice.

The following years saw a constant battle between the government in charge and the Métis people that also created conflict involving citizenship of Métis leaders, such as Louis Riel, who was crossing the border without proper notice. This caused repercussions for Riel who was now wanted by the Ontario government. He was later accused for the Scott Death, a murder case which was decided without a proper trial and by 1874 there was a warrant out for his arrest in Winnipeg. Because of the warrant accusations in Canada, Riel saw the United States as a safer territory for himself and the Métis people. The following years led to Riel running from the Canadian government because of the murder convictions and this is when he spent most of his time in the United States. Riel struggled with mental health problems and decided in the following years that it was time to receive proper treatment in the American northeast from 1875 to 1878. Once better decided to change his life by obtaining an American residence and decided to complete the journey of the liberation of the Métis people that he first started in 1869. With the help of the United States military, Riel wanted to invade Manitoba to obtain control. However, because of the lack of desire to cause conflict with the Canadian military the American military rejected his proposition. He then tried to create an international alliance between the Aboriginal and Metis people, which wasn't a success either. In the end his main objective was to simply improve the living conditions and rights of the Métis people in the United States. The failed attempts for Riel to defend the Métis community lead to further mental breakdowns and hospitalization, now in Quebec.

Riel returned to Montana from 1879 to continue on his mission to defend the Métis community in the United States. Riel wanted the Métis and the Native people of the region to join forces and create a political movement against the provisional government. Both parties denied this profound movement and after yet another failed attempt to create a revolution he decided to officially become an American citizen and declared “The United States sheltered me, The English didn't care/what they owe they will pay/! I am citizen”. He then spent the next four years improving the conditions of the Montana Métis in any way he could.

Riel stayed in the United States from 1880 to 1884 fighting to obtain official residency from the American government but without success he finally departed for Saskatchewan in 1884. Riel concentrated his public life on improving the situation of the Montana Metis and had a big impact on the Métis people in the United States by attempting to address their rights and improve overall living conditions. The following years was a constant battle to obtain official citizenship from the American government. In the end, an American citizenship did not permit the protection from Canadian convictions. The American officials did not confirm his American citizenship because of fear of further conflict with the Canadian government and confirmed Riel's execution for treason in 1885.

The Medicine Line (Canada–U.S. border)
The Métis homeland existed before the implementation of the Canada–U.S. border and continues to exist on both sides of this border today. The implementation of the border affected the Métis in a multitude of ways, with border enforcement growing from relaxed to increasingly stronger over time. In the late 18th century, to early 19th century the Métis found that in times of conflict, they could cross the 49th parallel North in either direction and the trouble following them would stop and so the border was known as the Medicine Line. This began to change toward the end of the 19th century when the border became more enforced and the Canadian government saw an opportunity to put an end to the line hopping by using military force. This effectively split some of the Métis population and restricted the mobility of the People. The enforcement of the border was used as a means for governments on either side of the Medicine Line in the grand prairies to control the Métis population and to restrict their access to buffalo. Because of the importance of kinship and mobility for Métis communities, this had negative implications and resulted in different experiences and hardships for people in the now divided group.

Métis experience in the U.S. is largely coloured by unratified treaties and the lack of federal representation of Métis communities as a legitimate people, and this can be seen in the case of the Little Shell Tribe in Montana. While experiences in Canada are also affected by the misrecognition of the Métis, many Métis were dispossessed of their lands when they were sold to settlers and some communities set up Road Allowance villages. These small villages were squatters' villages along Crown land outside of established villages in the prairies of Canada. These villages were often burned by local authorities and had to be rebuilt by surviving members of the communities who lived in them.

See also

 List of Métis people
 Little Shell Band of Chippewa Indians
 Index of articles related to Indigenous Canadians

Citations

Bibliography

 
 Andersen, C. (2014). "More Than the Sum of Our Rebellions: Métis Histories Beyond Batoche". Ethnohistory, 61(4), 619–633. 
 Andersen, Chris (2014) "Metis": Race, Recognition and the Struggle for Indigenous Peoplehood. Vancouver: UBC Press.
  Paperback. Book preview link provided.
 Barkwell, L. (n.d.). Metis Political Organizations.
 Barkwell, Lawrence (2013) [2002).  Métis Rights and Land Claims in Canada, An Annotated Bibliography.] Accessed September 1, 2019. 
 Barkwell, Lawrence J. (2010). The Battle of Seven Oaks: a Métis perspective. Winnipeg, Manitoba: Louis Riel Institute. .
 Barkwell, Lawrence J. (2010). Women of the Métis Nation, Winnipeg: Louis Riel Institute. .
 Barkwell, Lawrence J. (2011). Veterans and Families of the 1885 Northwest Resistance. Saskatoon: Gabriel Dumont Institute. 
 . 
 
 
 Barnholden, Michael. (2009). Circumstances Alter Photographs: Captain James Peters' Reports from the War of 1885. Vancouver, BC: Talonbooks. .
 
 
  CanLIIDocs 376.
 
 Dumont, Gabriel. Gabriel Dumont Speaks. Talonbooks, 2009. .
 
 
 
 
 
 
 
 
 
 
 
 
 
 
 
 .
 .
 
 
 
 
 
 
 
 
 
 
 
 
 Sawchuck, J. (2001). Negotiating an Identity: Métis Political Organizations, the Canadian Government, and Competing Concepts of Aboriginality. American Indian Quarterly, 25(1), 73–92.
 
 Teillet, Jean (2019). The North-West Is Our Mother: The Story of Louis Riel's People, Patrick Crean Editions. ISBN 978-1443450126
 
 
 
 Vrooman, N. (2019). There are a Range of Identities with Being Little Shell, Just As the Wider America. Distinctly Montana Magazine, pp 68–69 of 98.

External links

 The Rupertsland Institute (Alberta) – A service dedicated to the research and development, education, and training and employment of Métis individuals. It is affiliated with the Métis Nations of Alberta. Along with providing financial aid, the Rupertsland Institute helps Métis individuals acquire essential skills for employment.
 The Métis Museum – "Métis Political Organizations" compiled by Lawrence Barkwell, Louis Riel Institute; Manitoba, Canada
 "Metis Firsts in North America: Many Little Known Facts About the Metis" compiled by Lawrence Barkwell, Manitoba Métis Federation; Canada, 2011.
 Métis Nation
 Congress of Aboriginal Peoples
 Métis Museum (Gabriel Dumont Institute)
 Milan Métis Healing Art Project—MMHAP
 Métis in the Courts. Site includes interviews with legal and history experts on Métis issues.
 The MNO and “New” Historic Métis Communities - Darren O'Toole, University of Ottawa

Métis
Ethnic groups in Canada
Multiracial affairs
Pemmican War
North West Company
Fur trade